"Let's Fall in Love" is a song written by Harold Arlen (music) and Ted Koehler (lyrics) for the film Let's Fall in Love and published in 1933. In the film,  it is heard during the opening credits and later sung by Art Jarrett and chorus, and by Ann Sothern.

The major hit at the time of introduction was by Eddy Duchin (vocal by Lew Sherwood). It was originally written in C major with a "Moderately Bright" tempo marking. As a jazz standard, it is usually played with a medium swing beat.

Other notable recordings
 Annette Hanshaw, Feb 3, 1934, New York City, Vocalion 2635.
 Lee Wiley - Lee Wiley Sings Songs by Harold Arlen (1940), accompanied by Eddie Condon & His Orchestra
 The film Slightly French (1949) features the song as the central love theme and it is sung by Don Ameche and Dorothy Lamour.
 The film It Should Happen to You (1954) features the song as the central love theme between Jack Lemmon and Judy Holliday, who sing it several times interspersed with dialogue, and hum it together at the end.
 The Four Aces with the Jack Pleis Orchestra - Mood For Love (1955).
 Tony Middleton and the Willows recorded an uptempo doo-wop version of the song in 1957, which was released on Gone #5015.
 Muriel Landers sings the song in the 1958 Columbia Pictures Three Stooges comedy short Sweet and Hot. 
Ella Fitzgerald - Ella Fitzgerald Sings Sweet Songs for Swingers (1959), accompanied by the Frank De Vol Orchestra. She recorded it again with Billy May and a full orchestra for Ella Fitzgerald Sings the Harold Arlen Songbook (1961).
 Frank Sinatra - Ring-a-Ding-Ding!, Johnny Mandel - arranger, conductor, 1961.
 Shirley Bassey - for her album Let's Face the Music (1962)
 Linda Scott released a cover of the song as a single in 1963 that reached #108 on the Billboard chart.
 Soul duo Peaches and Herb recorded a cover of the song in 1966, which went to #11 on the US R&B singles chart and #21 on the Hot 100.
 Pat Collins, the hip hypnotist, sings a portion of the song in the 1967 Columbia Pictures release Divorce American Style.
 Robin Sarstedt had a hit with it in the Benelux countries in 1976.
 Diana Krall released it on When I Look in Your Eyes (1999)
 Rod Stewart released it on Thanks for the Memory: The Great American Songbook, Volume IV (2005)
 Art Garfunkel released it on Some Enchanted Evening (2007)
 Cliff Richard released it on Bold As Brass (2010)

In popular culture
 It also appeared in the British dark comedy movie Plots with a View (2002) when the version by Shirley Bassey was heard.

References

Pop standards
Songs with music by Harold Arlen
Songs with lyrics by Ted Koehler
Linda Scott songs
Shirley Bassey songs
1933 songs
1930s jazz standards